The Equestrian statue of Charlemagne (1725), which portrays the Holy Roman Emperor Charlemagne (742–814), was commissioned by Pope Clement XI (1649–1721) and carved by the Italian artist Agostino Cornacchini (1686–1754). It stands to the left of the portico of St Peter's Basilica.

See also
 Iconography of Charlemagne

References

External links

 http://stpetersbasilica.info/Statues/Charlemagne/Charlemagne.htm

Sculptures in Vatican City
Cultural depictions of Charlemagne
Apostolic Palace
Sculptures of men
Equestrian statues
Monuments and memorials in Europe
1725 works